Indian agency police were policemen hired by United States Indian agents during the late 19th and early 20th centuries and assigned to a Native American tribe. It was the duty of Indian agency police to enforce federal laws, the laws of the state where their reservation was located, and the terms of the federal treaties with their tribal authority.

Many tribes had no recognizable governments and therefore no tribal laws. On these tribes' reservations, the Indian agent hired tribal members to effect law and order according to federal, agency, and treaty rules. 

Some tribes, such as the Cherokee, had well-developed systems of tribal laws and tribal courts; the agency police also enforced these laws, and they testified and maintained order in the tribal courts. Since the agency police were federal officers, crimes against them had to be tried in a United States district court.

Several Indian agency police were responsible for the death of the Lakota leader Sitting Bull.

See also
Australian native police
Indian tribal police
Lighthorse (American Indian police)
United States Indian Police

References
Bureau of Indian Affairs. Indian Law Enforcement History. Republished at Tribal Court Clearinghouse from original published by Bureau of Indian Affairs and archived at  Archive.org
Ellis, Mark R. "Indian Police", Encyclopedia of the Great Plains. University of Nebraska–Lincoln, 2011.
Remington, Frederic, "On the Indian Reservations". The Century, Vol. 38, Issue 4, August 1889, pp 536–545.
Indian Affairs: Laws and Treaties. Vol. I, Laws (Compiled to December 1, 1902).

Native American tribal police
History of the American West
 Indian agency police